The following is a list of notable people from Kinshasa.

Politics, military, business 
 Gael Bussa, politician elected National Deputy in the constituency of Budjala, in the province of South-Ubangi, in the 2018 Democratic Republic of the Congo general election.
Justin Marie Bomboko
 Mwazulu Diyabanza, pan-African activist and founder of the Front Multiculturel Anti-Spoliation
 David Norris, scholar and politician, 2011 election candidate for President of Ireland
 Joseph Damien Tshatshi, colonel in the Armée Nationale Congolaise
 Emmanuel Weyi, Congolese entrepreneur

Ecclesiastics 
 Mutombo Kalombo Leopold, Congolese Writer and ecclesiastic.

Athletes 
 Flo Thamba, starting center for 2020-21 NCAA Champion Baylor Bears basketball team
 D. J. Mbenga, professional basketball player for the Los Angeles Lakers in the US National Basketball Association
 Emmanuel Mudiay, professional basketball player of the New York Knicks in the US National Basketball Association
 Christian Eyenga, professional basketball player and 2009 first round draft choice for the Cleveland Cavaliers in the US National Basketball Association
 Dikembe Mutombo, retired professional basketball player
 Christian M'Pumbu, professional mixed martial arts fighter and Bellator Fighting Championships World Champion
 Guylain Ndumbu-Nsungu, former Sheffield Wednesday football player
 Jeremy Bokila, professional football player, son of Ndingi Bokila Mandjombolo
 Claude Makélélé, professional football player and current manager
 Steve Mandanda, professional footballer who plays for  Marseille and the France national football team
 Ariza Makukula, naturalised Portuguese retired professional football player 
 José Bosingwa, naturalised Portuguese football player 
 Leroy Lita, professional football player 
 Fabrice Muamba, former professional footballer who played for Bolton Wanderers in the Premier League
 Tim Biakabutuka, former professional American football player
 Kazenga LuaLua, professional football player for Brighton & Hove Albion F.C.
 Lomana LuaLua, professional football player for Al-Arabi in Qatar
 Mwamba Kazadi, former professional football player who won the 1973 "African Footballer of the Year" award
 Péguy Luyindula, professional football player for Paris Saint-Germain in Ligue 1
 Hérita Ilunga, professional football player 
 Gary Kikaya, retired Olympic 400-metre runner
 Patrick Kabongo, professional football player for the Edmonton Eskimos of the Canadian Football League
 Youssouf Mulumbu, professional footballer for Norwich City 
 Danny Mwanga, professional footballer for the Philadelphia Union
 Blaise Nkufo, professional footballer for Switzerland
 Gabriel Zakuani, professional football player for Peterborough United of League One in England
 Steve Zakuani, professional football player for the Seattle Sounders of Major League Soccer in the United States
 Occupé Bayenga, professional football player who currently plays in Universidad de Concepción, Chilean Primera División
 Christian Benteke, professional football player for Crystal Palace F.C. of the Premier League and the Belgium national football team
 Jody Lukoki, professional football player for Ludogorets Razgrad in the Bulgarian First League and the DR Congo national football team
 Aristote Nsiala, professional football player for Ipswich Town
 Silas Katompa Mvumpa, professional footballer player for VfB Stuttgart

Artists 
 Maître Gims, rapper-singer
 Jimmy Omonga, singer-songwriter
 Werrason, singer-songwriter
 Lokua Kanza, singer-songwriter
 Ya Kid K, hip-hop artist
 Leki, R&B artist
 Jessy Matador, singer
 Odette Krempin, fashion designer
 Kaysha, hip-hop artist
 Merveille Lukeba, professional actor for the series Skins on E4
 Mohombi, pop, hip-hop artist
 Fally Ipupa, singer-songwriter
 Koffi Olomide, singer-songwriter
 Papa Wemba, singer-songwriter
 Damso- Singer, hip hop artist

Others 
 Buata Malela, comparative literature specialist and historian
 Pierre Mambele, taxi driver with an extensive journalist clientele 
 Ngalula Mubenga, engineer

References

People from Kinshasa
Kinshasa